Barynotus margaritaceus is a species in the weevil family (Curculionidae). This species is present in the mountains of Austria, France, Italy and Switzerland.

References
 Fauna Europaea
 EoL

Entiminae
Beetles described in 1824